Joanna Jeffrees is an English actress. She was born in Winchester, Hampshire. She is notable for her work in television, including the British TV series The Ruth Rendell Mysteries. Joanna Jeffrees can be seen later this year playing the role of Kirsty in the Channel 5 TV reconstruction documentary drama 'Fingers in the Till', made by Silver River Productions, directed by Sam Wildman.

Life
Joanna Jeffrees had her first London acting agent at fourteen, Movie Mites, and whilst with them auditioned for a role in the Stanley Kubrick film Eyes Wide Shut. By the age of sixteen Joanna had played a variety of minor TV roles, including being the invited guest on the Cable TV Series 'Cash In Hand'. Joanna then went on to play Ellen Malpass alongside Janet Suzman, Joyce Redman, Edward Hardwicke and Richard Johnson in the Ruth Rendell Mystery 'Front Seat', directed by Sandy Johnson for Meridan and ITV Productions. More recently Joanna can be seen as the female job candidate in an episode of the British comedy TV series Peep Show, and as one of the regular daily commuters in the two part BBC TV drama 'The 7:39', starring Sheridan Smith and David Morrissey.

Joanna Jeffrees has recently filmed the role of the Nursemaid in The Suspicions of Mr Whicher- The murder in Angel lane', alongside Olivia Colman and Paddy Considine, directed by Christopher Menaul for Hat Trick Productions and ITV.

Joanna Jeffrees studied Performing Arts at Fareham College in Hampshire and whilst there she received distinction in her Lamda Acting Medals and certificates. Joanna then went on to train at the Academy of Live and Recorded Arts in London.

Career 
 Pride and Prejudice and Zombies - Feature Film - Victorian Dancer
 Nurse - BBC Two - Woman 
 Harry & Paul's Story of the Two's (2014) BBC 2 - Great British Bake Off Baker 
 Critical - (2014) Sky 1 - C T Scanner Technician (Recurring role)
 Fingers in the Till - (2014) - Silver River Productions/Channel 5 - Plays the main character in the story, Kirsty 
 Flack - (2013) - Channel 4 - Chemist Customer
 The 7.39 - (2013) - Carnival Films/BBC - Regular Daily Commuter
 The Suspicions of Mr Whicher - The Murder In Angel Lane - (2013) - ITV Productions - Nursemaid
 Chickens - (2013) - Big Talk Productions/Sky 1 - Irate Village Woman at Parish Meeting
 Law & Order: UK - (2013) - Kudos Film &Television - Press Officer
 The World's End (2013) Feature Film - Blank dancer at school reunion disco
 Peep Show (2012) Channel 4 - Female Job Candidate at the Bathroom Shop
 Holby City (2012) BBC TV - Private Secretary
 Misfits (2012) Clerkenwell Films/Channel 4 TV - Guest at Wake
 Cuban Fury (2013) Feature Film - Girl at Bowling Alley
 Skyfall (2012) Feature Film - Whitehall Commuter
  Barclaycard Photobooth Advert (2012) - TV Advert - Woman by Photobooth
 Sparks and Embers (2012) Feature Film - Pub Customer
 StreetDance 2 3D (2012) - Dance off Spectator
 The Paris Experience (2009) - Olivia
 Always Left Wondering (2005) - Mum
 Ushers (2003) - Jo
 Front Seat The Ruth Rendell Mysteries - Ellen Malpass
 The Ruth Rendell Mysteries (TV series) (1993-1998) - Various
 Killer Net (1998) - Girl on seafront
 The Woodlanders (1997) - Peasant Girl
 The Man Who Made Husbands Jealous (1997) - Friend at concert

References

External links
  Joanna Jeffrees IMDb
 Joanna Jeffrees at the BFI Film and TV Database
 Joanna Jeffrees at NY Times.com
 The Suspicions of Mr Whicher 2 Cast
  Peep Show Cast List for Series 8.Ep.1

Year of birth missing (living people)
Living people
English television actresses
Actors from Winchester
English film actresses
Alumni of the Academy of Live and Recorded Arts